Government Girls Polytechnic, Bilaspur is a Government-run Technical Institute located in Bilaspur, Chhattisgarh, India. It was established in 2008 by Government of Chhattisgarh, it is affiliated to Chhattisgarh Swami Vivekanand Technical University, Bhilai approved by All India Council for Technical Education, New Delhi. 

It offers Diploma in Computer Science and Engineering, Information Technology and Electronics and Telecommunication Engineering with intake capacity of 45 students each.

Location
The classes are being conducted at the Government Girls polytechnic koni Bilaspur.It was shift in new building 2018

See also
Government Polytechnic, Korba
Government Polytechnic, Ambikapur

References

Education in Bilaspur, Chhattisgarh
Engineering colleges in Chhattisgarh
Educational institutions established in 2008
2008 establishments in Chhattisgarh